Massachusetts Senate's Worcester, Hampden, Hampshire and Middlesex district in the United States is one of 40 legislative districts of the Massachusetts Senate. It covers portions of Hampden, Hampshire, Middlesex, and Worcester counties. In the 2020 United States presidential election, the district was the only one in the state where incumbent President Donald Trump won. Since 2015 it is represented in the State Senate by Anne Gobi of the Democratic Party.

Towns represented
The district includes the following localities:
 Ashburnham
 Ashby
 Athol
 Barre
 Brimfield
 Brookfield
 Charlton
 East Brookfield
 Hardwick
 Holland
 Hubbardston
 Monson
 New Braintree
 North Brookfield
 Oakham
 Palmer
 Paxton
 Petersham
 Phillipston
 Rutland
 Spencer
 Sturbridge
 Templeton
 Wales
 Ware
 Warren
 West Brookfield
 Winchendon

Senators 
 Robert D. Wetmore
 Stephen Brewer
 Anne Gobi, 2015-current

See also
 List of Massachusetts Senate elections
 List of Massachusetts General Courts
 List of former districts of the Massachusetts Senate

References

External links
 Ballotpedia
  (State Senate district information based on U.S. Census Bureau's American Community Survey).

Senate
Government in Worcester County, Massachusetts
Government of Hampden County, Massachusetts
Government of Hampshire County, Massachusetts
Government of Middlesex County, Massachusetts
Massachusetts Senate